Isfahan, from its ancient designation Aspadana and, later, Spahan in middle Persian, rendered in English as Ispahan, is a major city in the Central District of the Isfahan Province of Iran. The city has a population of approximately 2,220,000, making it the third-largest city in Iran, after Tehran and Mashhad, and the second-largest metropolitan area.

Isfahan is located at the intersection of the two principal routes that traverse Iran, north–south and east–west. Isfahan flourished between the 9th and 18th centuries. Under the Safavid dynasty, Isfahan became the capital of Persia, for the second time in its history, under Shah Abbas the Great. The city retains much of its history. It is famous for its Perso–Islamic architecture, grand boulevards, covered bridges, palaces, tiled mosques, and minarets. Isfahan also has many historical buildings, monuments, paintings, and artifacts. The fame of Isfahan led to the Persian proverb Esfahān nesf-e-jahān ast (Isfahan is half (of) the world). Naqsh-e Jahan Square in Isfahan is one of the largest city squares in the world, and UNESCO has designated it a World Heritage Site.

Etymology
Isfahan is derived from Middle Persian , which is attested to by various Middle Persian seals and inscriptions, including that of the Zoroastrian magi Kartir. The present-day name is the Arabicized form of Ispahan (unlike Middle Persian, but similar to Spanish, New Persian does not allow initial consonant clusters such as sp). The region is denoted by the abbreviation GD (Southern Media) on Sasanian coins. Some of the other ancient names include Gey, Jey (old form Zi), Park, and Judea.

History

Human habitation of the Isfahan region can be traced back to the Palaeolithic period. Archaeologists have recently found artifacts dating back to the Palaeolithic, Mesolithic, Neolithic, Bronze, and Iron ages.

Bronze Age
What became the city of Isfahan likely emerged and gradually developed over the course of the Elamite civilisation (2700–1600 BCE).

Zoroastrian era

Under Median rule, a commercial entrepôt began to show signs of more sedentary urbanism, steadily growing into a noteworthy regional center that benefited from the exceptionally fertile soil on the banks of the Zayandehrud River, in a region called Aspandana or Ispandana.

When Cyrus the Great unified Persian and Median lands into the Achaemenid Empire, the religiously and ethnically diverse city of Isfahan became an early example of the king's fabled religious tolerance. It was Cyrus who, having just taken Babylon, made an edict in 538 BCE declaring that Jews in Babylon could return to Jerusalem. Later, some of the freed Jews settled in Isfahan instead of returning to their homeland. The 10th-century Persian historian Ibn al-Faqih wrote:

The Parthians (247 BCE–224 CE), continued the tradition of tolerance after the fall of the Achaemenids, fostering a Hellenistic dimension within Iranian culture and the political organization introduced by Alexander the Great's invading armies. Under the Parthians, Arsacid governors administered the provinces of the nation from Isfahan, and the city's urban development accelerated to accommodate the needs of a capital city.

The next empire to rule Persia, the Sassanids (224 CE–651 CE), presided over massive changes in their realm, instituting sweeping agricultural reforms and reviving Iranian culture and the Zoroastrian religion. Both the city and region were then called by the name Aspahan or Spahan. The city was governed by a group called the Espoohrans, who descended from seven noble Iranian families. Extant foundations of some Sassanid-era bridges in Isfahan suggest that the Sasanian kings were fond of ambitious urban-planning projects. While Isfahan's political importance declined during this period, many Sassanid princes would study statecraft in the city, and its military role increased. Its strategic location at the intersection of the ancient roads to Susa and Persepolis made it an ideal candidate to house a standing army, which would be ready to march against Constantinople at any moment. The words "Aspahan" and "Spahan" are derived from the Pahlavi or Middle Persian meaning 'the place of the army'.

Although many theories have mentioned the origins of Isfahan, little is known of it before the rule of the Sasanian dynasty. The gradual population decrease of Gay (Jay) and the simultaneous population increase of Yahudiyyeh and its suburbs, after the Islamic conquest of Iran, resulted in the formation of the nucleus of what was to become the city of Isfahan. The words "Aspadana", "Ispadana", "Spahan", and "Sepahan", all from which the word Isfahan is derived, referred to the region in which the city was located.

Isfahan and Gay were supposedly both circular in design, which was characteristic of Parthian and Sasanian cities. However, this reported Sasanian circular city of Isfahan has not yet been uncovered.

Islamic era

When the Arabs captured Isfahan in 642, they made it the capital of al-Jibal ("the Mountains") province, an area that covered much of ancient Media. Isfahan grew prosperous under the Persian Buyid (Buwayhid) dynasty, which rose to power and ruled much of Iran when the temporal authority of the Abbasid caliphs waned in the 10th century. The city walls of Isfahan are thought to have been constructed during the tenth century. The Turkish conqueror and founder of the Seljuq dynasty, Toghril Beg, made Isfahan the capital of his domains in the mid-11th century; but it was under his grandson Malik-Shah I (r. 1073–92) that the city grew in size and splendour.

After the fall of the Seljuqs (c. 1200), Isfahan temporarily declined and was eclipsed by other Iranian cities, such as Tabriz and Qazvin. During his visit in 1327, Ibn Battuta noted that "The city of Isfahan is one of the largest and fairest of cities, but it is now in ruins for the greater part."

In 1387, Isfahan surrendered to the Turko-Mongol warlord Timur. Initially treated with relative mercy, the city revolted against Timur's punitive taxes by killing the tax collectors and some of Timur's soldiers. In retribution, Timur ordered the massacre of the city residents, his soldiers killing a reported 70,000 citizens. An eye-witness counted more than 28 towers, each constructed of about 1,500 heads.

Isfahan regained its importance during the Safavid period (1501–1736). The city's golden age began in 1598 when the Safavid ruler Abbas I of Persia (reigned 1588–1629) made it his capital and rebuilt it into one of the largest and most beautiful cities in the 17th-century world. In 1598, Abbas I moved his capital from Qazvin to the more central Isfahan. He introduced policies increasing Iranian involvement in the Silk Road trade. Turkish, Armenian, and Persian craftsmen were forcefully resettled in the city to ensure its prosperity. Their contributions to the economic vitality of the revitalized city supported the recovery of Safavid glory and prestige, after earlier losses to the Ottomans and Kızılbaş tribes,  ushering in a golden age for the city, when architecture and Persian culture flourished.

As part of Abbas's forced resettlement of peoples from within his empire, as many as 300,000 Armenians (primarily from Jugha) were resettled in Isfahan during Abbas' reign.) In Isfahan, he ordered the establishment of a new quarter for these resettled Armenians from Old Julfa, and thus the Armenian Quarter of Isfahan was named New Julfa (today one of the largest Armenian quarters in the world).

In the 16th and 17th centuries, thousands of deportees and migrants from the Caucasus settled in the city. Following an agreement between Shah Abbas I and his Georgian subject Teimuraz I of Kakheti ("Tahmuras Khan"), whereby the latter converted to Islam and submitted to Safavid rule in exchange for being allowed to rule as the region's wāli (governor), with his son serving as dāruḡa (prefect) of Isfahan. He was accompanied by a troop of soldiers, some of whom were Georgian Orthodox Christians. The royal court in Isfahan had a great number of Georgian ḡolāms (military slaves), as well as Georgian women. Although they spoke both Persian and Turkic, their mother tongue was Georgian. Now the city had enclaves of those of Georgian, Circassian, and Daghistani descent. Engelbert Kaempfer, who dwelt in Safavid Persia in 1684–85, estimated their number at 20,000.

During Abbas's reign, Isfahan became famous in Europe, and many European travellers, such as Jean Chardin, gave accounts of their visits to the city. The city's prosperity lasted until it was sacked by Afghan invaders in 1722, during a marked decline in Safavid influence. Thereafter, Isfahan experienced a decline in importance, culminating in moving the capital to Mashhad and Shiraz during the Afsharid and Zand periods, respectively, until it was finally moved to Tehran, in 1775, by Agha Mohammad Khan, the founder of the Qajar dynasty.

In the early years of the 19th century, efforts were made to preserve some of Isfahan's archeologically important buildings. The work was started by Mohammad Hossein Khan, during the reign of Fath Ali Shah.

Modern age

In the 20th century, Isfahan was resettled by many people from southern Iran: especially during the population migrations at the start of the century, and in the 1980s, following the Iran–Iraq War. During the war, 23,000 from Isfahan were killed; and there were 43,000 veterans.

Today, Isfahan produces fine carpets, textiles, steel, handicrafts, and traditional foods, including sweets. Isfahan is noted for its production of the Isfahan rug, a type of Persian rug typically made of merino wool and silk. There are nuclear experimental reactors as well as uranium conversion facilities (UCF) for producing nuclear fuel in the environs of the city. Isfahan has one of the largest steel-producing facilities in the region, as well as facilities for producing special alloys. The Mobarakeh Steel Company is the biggest steel producer in the whole of the Middle East and Northern Africa, and it is the biggest DRI producer in the world. The Isfahan Steel Company was the first manufacturer of constructional steel products in Iran, and it remains the largest such company today.

There is a major oil refinery and a large air-force base outside the city. HESA, Iran's most advanced aircraft manufacturing plant, is located just outside the city. Isfahan is also attracting international investment. Isfahan hosted the International Physics Olympiad in 2007. In 2020, the Iran-Qatar Joint Economic Commission met in the city.

Geography

The city is located on the plain of the Zayandeh Rud (Fertile River) and the foothills of the Zagros mountain range. The nearest mountain is Mount Soffeh (Kuh-e Soffeh), just south of the city.

Hydrography
An artificial network of canals, whose components are called madi, were built during the Safavid dynasty for channeling water from Zayandeh Roud river into different parts of the city. Designed by Sheikh Bahaï, an engineer of Shah Abbas, this network has 77 madis in the northern course, and 71 in the southern course of the Zayandeh Rud. In 1993, this centuries-old network provided 91% of agricultural water, 4% of industrial needs, and 5% of city needs. 70 emergency wells were dug in 2018 to avoid water shortages.

Ecological issues

Towns and villages around Isfahan have been hit so hard by drought and water diversion that they have emptied out and people who lived there have moved. An anonymous journalist said that what's called drought is more often the mismanagement of water. The subsidence rate is dire, and the aquifer level decreases by one meter annually. As of 2020, the city had the worst air quality between major Iranian cities.

Flora and fauna

The Damask rose cultivar Rosa 'Ispahan' is named after the city.

 

Cows endemic to Isfahan became extinct in 2020.

Wagtails are often seen in farmlands and parks.

The mole cricket is one of the major pests of plants, especially grass roots.

Sheep and rams are symbols of Isfahan.

Climate

However, with low humidity and moderate temperatures at night, the climate is quite pleasant. During the winter, days are cool while nights can be very cold. Snow falls an average of 6.7 days each winter. However, generally Isfahan's climate is extremely dry.

The Zayande River starts in the Zagros Mountains, flowing from the west through the heart of the city, then dissipates in the Gavkhouni wetland. Planting olive trees in the city is economically viable, because such trees can survive water shortages.

Transportation

Roads and freeways
Over the past decade, Isfahan's internal highway network has been undergoing a major expansion. Much care has been taken to prevent damage to valuable, historical buildings. Modern freeways connect the city to Iran's other major cities, including the capital Tehran,  to the north, and Shiraz,  to the south. Highways also service satellite cities surrounding the metropolitan area.

The Isfahan Eastern Bypass Freeway is under construction.

In 2021, a new AVL system was deployed in the city.

Bridges
The bridges over the Zayanderud comprise some of the finest architecture in Isfahan. The oldest is the Shahrestan Bridge, whose foundations were built during the Sasanian Empire (3rd–7th century Sassanid era); it was repaired during the Seljuk period. Further upstream is the Khaju Bridge, which Shah Abbas II built in 1650.

Another bridge is the Choobi (Joui) Bridge, which was originally an aqueduct to supply the palace gardens on the north bank of the river. Further upstream again is the Si-o-Seh Pol or bridge of 33 arches. It was built during the reign of Shah Abbas the Great by Sheikh Baha'i and connected Isfahan with the Armenian suburb of New Julfa.

Another notable bridge is the Marnan Bridge.

Ride sharing
Snapp! and Tapsi are two of the carpooling apps in the city.
As part of Iran's religious laws, women are forbidden to use the public bicycle-sharing network, as decreed by the representative of the Supreme Leader in Isfahan, Ayatollah Yousef Tabatabai Nejad, and General Attorney Ali Esfahani.

Mass transit
The Isfahan and Suburbs Bus Company operates transit buses in the city. East-West BRT Bus Rapid Transit Line buses carry up to 120,000 passengers daily.

The municipality has signed a memorandum with Khatam-al Anbiya to construct a tram network in the city.

The Isfahan Metro was opened on 15 October 2015.

The city is served by a railway station, with the Islamic Republic of Iran Railways running trains to Bandarabbas and Mashhad. The first high-speed railway in Iran, the Tehran-Qom-Isfahan line is currently being constructed and will connect Isfahan to Tehran and Qom.

Airports
Isfahan is served by Isfahan International Airport, which in 2019 was the 7th busiest airport in Iran.

Economy

In 2014, industry, mines, and commerce in Isfahan province accounted for 35% to 50% (almost $229 billion) of the Iranian Gross Domestic Product. In 2019, Isfahan province's governorate said that tourism is the number one priority.

According to Isfahan province's administrator for Department of Cooperatives, Labour, and Social Welfare, Iran has the cheapest labor workforce anywhere in the world; and this attracts foreign investors. The labor force has continually grown over the last three decades. However, in 2018 the unemployment rate was 15%.

The , established in 1992, maintains a privatized power grid in the city.

As of September 2020, the handicrafts industry of Isfahan Province was contributing $500 million annually to the economy.

The municipality has implemented internet payment software.

Isfahan Fair, a  exhibition center aimed at increasing tourism, is under construction.

Aquaculture and agriculture

Isfahan city produces 1,300 tons of salmon. More than 28% of the country's ornamental fish is supplied from Isfahan province, from 780 farms, which in 2017 farmed 65.5 million fish.

Opium was produced and exported from Isfahan from 1850 until it became illegal, and was an important source of income. Isfahan has a large number of aqueducts, farmers having to divert water from the river to farms by canal. Niasarm is one of the largest canals.
From 2012 to 2013 there were large protests by farmers against the Isfahan-Yazd water tunnel. In 2019, eastern city farmers demanded water, otherwise they would sabotage water transfer pipes.
Fruits and vegetables central market is where farmers sell their product wholesale, selling 10,000 tons a day.

High tech and heavy industries
The industrialization of Isfahan dates from the Pahlavi period, as in all of Iran, and was marked by the strong growth of the textile industry, which earned the city the nickname "Manchester of Persia". There are 9,200 industrial units in the city; 40% of the Iranian textile industry is in Isfahan.

The Telecommunication Company of Iran and the Mobile Telecommunication Company of Iran provide 4G, 3G, broadband, and VDSL.

The Isfahan Scientific and Research Town started in 2001, to act as a mediator between government, industry, and academia in establishing a knowledge-based economy.

Isfahan is the third-largest medicine manufacturing hub in Iran.

Recreation and tourism

In 2018–2019 some 450,000 foreign nationals visited the city. Some 110 trillion rials (over $2 billion at the official rate of 42,000 rials in 2020) have been invested in the province's tourism sector.

Nazhvan Park hosts a reptile zoo with 40 aquariums.
There are the Saadi water park and the Nazhvan water park for children.

There are many luxury party gardens and  wedding halls.

Medical tourism
The Isfahan Healthcare city complex, built on a  site near the Aqa Babaei Expressway, is intended to boost the city's medical tourism revenues.

Shopping

The city is served by Refah Chain Stores Co., Iran Hyper Star, Isfahan City Center, Shahrvand Chain Stores Inc., Kowsar Market, and the Isfahan Mall.

Cinemas
There are nine cinemas. Historically, cinemas in old Isfahan were entertainment for the worker class while religious people considered cinema to be mostly an impure place and going to the cinema to be haram. During the 1979 revolution, many cinemas in Isfahan were burned down. Cinema Iran, now a ruin, was one of the oldest cinemas in the city. Great filmmakers such as Agnès Varda and Pier Paolo Pasolini shot scenes from their films in Isfahan.

Sports

Isfahan has three association football clubs that play professionally. These are:

 Sepahan S.C.
 Zob Ahan Isfahan F.C.
 Sanaye Giti Pasand F.C.
 Polyacryl Esfahan F.C. (historic)

Sepahan has won the most league football titles among Iranian clubs (2002–03, 2009–10, 2010–11, 2011–12 and 2014–15). The Foolad Mobarakeh Sepahan handball team plays in the Iranian handball league. Sepahan has a youth women running team that became national champions in 2020.

Giti Pasand has a futsal team, Giti Pasand FSC, which is one of the best in Asia. They won the AFC Futsal Club Championship in 2012 and were runners-up in 2013. Giti Pasand also fields a women's volleyball team, Giti Pasand Isfahan VC, that plays matches in the Iranian Women's Volleyball League.

Basketball clubs include Zob Ahan Isfahan BC and Foolad Mahan Isfahan BC.

There are Pahlevani zoorkhanehs in the city.

Demographics

In 2019, the mean age for first marriages was 25 years for females and 30 years for males.

There are almost 500,000 people living in slums, including in the northern part, and especially in the eastern sector of the city.

Esfahani is one of the main dialects of Western Persian. Jewish districts speak a unique dialect.

Religion
There are many churches and synagogues in the city, with the churches being for the most part in New Julfa.

Mosques

 Agha Nour mosque (16th century)
 Hakim Mosque
 Ilchi mosque
 Jameh Mosque
 Jarchi mosque (1610)
 Lonban mosque
 Maghsoudbeyk mosque (1601)
 Mohammad Jafar Abadei mosque (1878)
 Rahim Khan mosque (19th century)
 Roknolmolk mosque
 Seyyed mosque (19th century)
 Shah Mosque (1629) - It was damaged in 2022
 Sheikh Lotf Allah Mosque (1618)

Imamzadehs (shrine tombs)

 Imamzadeh Ahmad
 Imamzadeh Esmaeil and Isaiah mausoleum
 Imamzadeh Haroun-e-Velayat
 Imamzadeh Ja'far
 Imamzadeh Shah Zeyd

Churches and cathedrals

Churches are mostly located in the New Julfa region. The oldest is St. Jakob Church (1607). Some other historically important ones are St. Georg Church (17th century), St. Mary Church (1613), Bedkhem Church (1627), and Vank Cathedral (1664).

Pacifique de Provins established a French mission in the city in 1627.

Synagogues

 Kenisa-ye Bozorg (Mirakhor's kenisa)
 Kenisa-ye Molla Rabbi
 Kenisa-ye Sang-bast
 Mullah Jacob Synagogue
 Mullah Neissan Synagogue
 Kenisa-ye Keter David

Civic administration

Isfahan has a smart city program, a unified human resources administration system, and a transport system.

In 2015, the comprehensive atlas of the Isfahan metropolis, an online statistical database in Farsi, was made available, to help in planning.

In 2020, the municipality directly employed 6,250 people with an additional 3,000 people in 16 subsidiary organizations.

In 2020, the municipality created a document outlining future development programs for the city.

The color theme for the city has been turquoise for some time.

Municipal government
The mayor is Ghodratollah Noroozi.

The chairman of the city council is Alireza Nasrisfahani. There is also a leadership council within the city council.

The representative of the Supreme Leader of Iran, as well as the representative from Isfahan in the Assembly of Experts, is Yousef Tabatabai Nejad.

The city is divided into 15 municipal districts.

Public works
City waste is processed and recycled at the Isfahan Waste Complex.

The  is responsible for piping water, waterworks installation and repair, maintaining sewage equipment, supervising sewage collection, and treatment and disposal of sewage in the city.

Human resources and public health
As of June 2020, 65% of the population of Isfahan province has social security insurance.

Isfahan is known as the Multiple sclerosis capital of the world due to the presence of polluting industries.

In 2015, almost 15% of the people suffered from depression, from being cut off from the Zayandeh River, due to severe drought.

Armed forces base

The Islamic Revolutionary Guard Corps Aerospace Force (IRGC AF) has an airbase in the city and has undertaken a cloud seeding contract project using UAVs in Isfahan. The Islamic Republic of Iran Air Force (IRIAF) has an airbase, the 8th Predator Tactical Fighter Base (TFB.8), which is the home base for Iranian F-14s. The local Sepah Pasdaran is named "Master of the Era" ("Saheb al zaman" in Arabic and Farsi), after the Mahdi. The Amir Al-Momenin University of Military Sciences and Technology is based in the city.

Education and science

The first elementary schools in the city were maktabkhanehs. In World War II, Polish children sought refuge in the city; eight primary and technical trade schools were established. Between 1942 and 1945, approximately 2,000 children passed through, with Isfahan briefly gaining the nickname "City of Polish Children". In 2019, there were 20 schools for trainees attended by 5,000 children.

Notable schools

 Chahar Bagh School (early 17th century)
 Harati
 Kassegaran school (1694)
 Khajoo Madrasa
 Nimavar School (1691)
 Sadr Madrasa (19th century)

In total, there are more than 7,329 schools in Isfahan province.

Colleges
In 1947, the Isfahan University of Medical Sciences was established; it now has almost 9,200 students and interns. In 1973, the American School of Isfahan was built; it closed during the 1978–79 revolution. In 1974, the first technical university in Iran, the Isfahan University of Technology, was established in the city. It focuses on science, engineering, and agriculture programs. In 1977, the Isfahan University of Art was established. It was temporarily closed after the 1979 revolution, and was reopened in 1984, after the Iranian Cultural Revolution.

Aside from seminaries and religious schools, the other public, private major universities of the Isfahan metropolitan area include: the Mohajer Technical And Vocational College of Isfahan, Payame Noor University, the Islamic Azad University of Isfahan, the Islamic Azad University of Najafabad, and the Islamic Azad University of Majlesi.

There are also more than 50 technical and vocational training centres in the province, under the administration of the Isfahan Technical and Vocational Training Organization (TVTO), that provide free, non-formal, workforce-skills training programs. As of 2020, 90% of workforce-skills trainees are women.

Notable philosophers

Major philosophers include Mir Damad, known for his concepts of time and nature, as well as for founding the School of Isfahan, and Mir Fendereski, who was known for his examination of art and philosophy within a society.

Culture

Ancient traditions included Tirgan, Sepandārmazgān festivals, and historically, men used to wear the Kolah namadi.

The Isfahan School of painting flourished during the Safavid era.

The annual Isfahan province theatre festival takes place in the city. Theater performances began in 1919 (1297 AH), and currently there are 9 active theaters.

The awarding of an Isfahan annual literature prize began in 2004.

Since 2005, November 22 is Isfahan's National Day, commemorated with various events.

New Art Paradise, built in District 6 in 2019, has the biggest open-air amphitheatre in the country.

Based on a statue creators' symposium in 2020, the city decided to add 11 permanent art pieces to the city's monuments.

The Isfahan international convention center is under construction.

Cuisine

Gosh-e fil and Doogh are famous local snacks. Other traditional breakfasts, desserts, and meals include Khoresht mast, Beryani, and meat with beans and pumpkin aush. Gaz & Poolaki are two popular Iranian candies types that originated in Isfahan.

Teahouses are supervised and allowed to offer Hookah until 2022. As of 2020, there are almost 300 teahouses with permits.

Music
The Bayat-e Esfahan is one of the modes used in Iranian traditional music.

On 12 and 13 January 2018, the Iranian singer Salar Aghili performed in the city without the female members of his band, due to interference by local officials at the Ministry of Islamic Culture and Guidance.

News media
During the Qajar era, Farhang, the first newspaper publication in the city, was printed for 13 years. Iran's Metropolitan News Agency (IMNA), formerly called the Isfahan Municipality News Agency, is based in the city.

The state-controlled Islamic Republic of Iran Broadcasting system (IRIB) has a TV network and radio channel in the city.

Cultural sites

The city centre consists of an older section centered around the Jameh Mosque, and the Safavid expansion around Naqsh-e Jahan Square, with nearby palaces, bazaars, and places of worship, which is called Seeosepol.

Baths
Ancient baths include the Jarchi hammam and the bathhouse of Bahāʾ al-dīn al-ʿĀmilī; a public bath called "Garmabeh-e-shaykh" in Isfahan, which for many years was running and providing hot water to the public without any visible heating system which would usually need tons of wood, was built by Baha' al-din al-'Amili. The Khosro Agha hammam was demolished by unknown persons in 1992. The Ali Gholi Agha hammam is another remaining bathhouse. Chardin writes that the number of baths in Isfahan in the Safavid era was 273.

Bazaars
The Grand Bazaar, Isfahan, and its entrance, the Qeysarie Gate, were built in the 17th century. Social hubs were opium dens and coffeehouses clustered around the Chahar bagh and the Chehel Sotoun. The best-known traditional coffeehouse is Qahva-ḵāna-ye Golestān. There is also the Honar Bazaar.

Cemeteries
The Bagh-e Rezvan Cemetery is one of the biggest and most advanced in the country. Other cemeteries include the New Julfa Armenian Cemetery and the Takht-e Foulad.

Gardens and parks
The Pardis Honar Park, in District 6, has cost 30 billion toman as of 2018. Some other zoological gardens and parks (including public and private beach parks, and non-beach parks) are: Birds Garden, Flower Garden of Isfahan, Nazhvan Recreational Complex, Moshtagh,  amusement park, and the East Park of Isfahan.

Historical houses

 Alam's House
 Amin's House
 Malek Vineyard
 Qazvinis' House
 Sheykh ol-Eslam's House
 Constitution House of Isfahan

Mausoleums and tombs

 Al-Rashid Mausoleum (12th century)
 Baba Ghassem Mausoleum (14th century)
 Mausoleum of Safavid Princes
 Nizam al-Mulk Tomb (11th century)
 Saeb Mausoleum
 Shahshahan mausoleum (15th century)
 Soltan Bakht Agha Mausoleum (14th century)

Minarets
Menar Jonban was built in the 14th century. Other menars include Ali minaret (11th century), Bagh-e-Ghoushkhane minaret (14th century), Chehel Dokhtaran minaret (12 century), Dardasht minarets (14th century), Darozziafe minarets (14th century), and Sarban minaret.

Museums

 Museum of Contemporary Art (17th-century building)
 Isfahan City Center museum (mall established 2012)
 Museum of Decorative Arts (1995)
 Natural History Museum of Isfahan (1988, 15th-century building)

Palaces and caravanserais

 Ali Qapu (Imperial Palace, early 17th century)
 Chehel Sotoun (Palace of Forty Columns, 1647)
 Hasht Behesht (Palace of Eight Paradises, 1669)
 Talar-e-Ashraf (Palace of Ashraf) (1650)
 Shah Caravanserai

Squares and streets

 Chaharbagh Boulevard (1596)
 Chaharbagh-e-khajou Boulevard
 Meydan Kohne (Old Square)
 Naqsh-e Jahan Square also known as Shah Square or Imam Square (1602)
 Amadegah
 Taleghani Street (Shah Street)

Other sites

 Atashgah – a Zoroastrian fire temple
 New Julfa (1606)
 Pigeon Towers that are placed all around the city namely 22 towers inside Gavart, Hase – 17th century
 Isfahan Observatory
 Asarkhane Shahi

International relations
There is a plan to create a diplomatic district next to the Imam Khamenei international convention center where foreign countries would locate their consulates.

The Chinese have expressed readiness to be the first country that opens a consulate in a diplomatic zone in the central city.

The building housing the General Consulate of the Russian Federation in Isfahan is a registered cultural heritage site.

The residence of Afghan nationals is allowed in Isfahan city.

Since 1994, Isfahan has been a member of the League of Historical Cities and a full member of Inter-City Intangible Cultural Cooperation Network.

The Isfahan municipality created a citizen diplomacy service program to boost establishing connections with sister cities around the world.

Twin towns – sister cities

Isfahan is twinned with:

 Baalbek, Lebanon (2010)
 Dakar, Senegal (2009)
 Florence, Italy (1998)
 Freiburg im Breisgau, Germany (2000)
 Havana, Cuba (2001)
 Iași, Romania (1999)
 Kuala Lumpur, Malaysia (1997)
 Kuwait City, Kuwait (2000)
 Lahore, Pakistan (2004)
 Saint Petersburg, Russia (2004)
 Yerevan, Armenia (2000)
 Xi'an, Shaanxi, China (1989)

Cooperation agreements
Isfahan cooperates with:
 Barcelona, Spain (2000)
 Gyeongju, South Korea (2013)

In addition, the New Julfa quarter of Isfahan has friendly relations with:
 Issy-les-Moulineaux, France (2018)

Notable people

Music
 Jalal Taj Esfahani (1903–1981)
 Alireza Eftekhari (1956–), singer
 Leila Forouhar (1959–), pop singer
 Hassan Kassai (1928–2012), musician
 Hassan Shamaizadeh (born 1943), songwriter and singer
 Jalil Shahnaz (1921–2013), tar soloist, a traditional Persian instrument

Film
 Rasul Sadr Ameli (1953–), director
Sara Bahrami (1983–), actor
 Homayoun Ershadi (1947–), Hollywood actor and architect
 Soraya Esfandiary-Bakhtiari (1956–2001), the former princess of Iran and actress
 Bahman Farmanara (1942–), director
 Jahangir Forouhar (1916–1997), actor and father of Leila Forouhar (Iranian singer)
 Mohamad Ali Keshvarz (1930–2020), actor
Mahdi Pakdel (1980–), actor
Nosratollah Vahdat (1925–2020), actor

Craftsmen and painters
 Mahmoud Farshchian (1930–), painter and miniaturist
 Bogdan Saltanov (1630s–1703), Russian icon painter of Isfahanian Armenian origin

Political figures
 Ahmad Amir-Ahmadi (1906–1965), military leader and cabinet minister
 Ayatollah Mohammad Beheshti (1928–1981), cleric, Chairman of the Council of Revolution of Iran
 Nusrat Bhutto, Chairman of Pakistan Peoples Party from 1979 to 1983; wife of Zulfikar Ali Bhutto; mother of Benazir Bhutto
 Hossein Fatemi, PhD (1919–1954), politician; foreign minister in Mohamed Mossadegh's cabinet
 Mohammad-Ali Foroughi (1875–1942), a politician and Prime Minister of Iran in the World War II era
 Dariush Forouhar (August 1928 – November 1998), a founder and leader of the Hezb-e Mellat-e Iran (Nation of Iran Party)
 Hossein Kharrazi (1957–1987), chief of the army in the Iran–Iraq War
 Mohsen Nourbakhsh (1948–2003), economist, Governor of the Central Bank of Iran
 Mohammad Javad Zarif (1960–), Minister of Foreign Affairs and former Ambassador of Iran to the United Nations

Religious figures
 Lady Amin (Banou Amin) (1886–1983), Iran's most outstanding female jurisprudent, theologian and great Muslim mystic (‘arif), a Lady Mujtahideh
 Amina Begum Bint al-Majlisi was a female Safavid mujtahideh
 Ayatollah Mohammad Beheshti (1928–1981), cleric, Chairman of the Council of Revolution of Iran
 Allamah al-Majlisi (1616–1698), Safavid cleric, Sheikh ul-Islam in Isfahan
 Salman the Persian
 Muhammad Ibn Manda (d. 1005 / AH 395), Sunni Hanbali scholar of hadith and historian
 Abu Nu'aym Al-Ahbahani Al-Shafi'i (d. 1038 / AH 430), Sunni Shafi'i Scholar
 Seyyed Ali Qazi Askar (1954) Iran's supreme leader representative, in Haj

Sportspeople
 Mohammad-Ali Asgari (1954–), Iranian football administrator 
 Abdolali Changiz (born 1957), football star of Esteghlal FC in the 1970s
 Mansour Ebrahimzadeh (born 1956), former player for Sepahan FC, former head coach of Zobahan
 Ghasem Haddadifar (born 1983), captain of Zobahan FC
 Arsalan Kazemi (born 1990), forward for the Oregon Ducks men's basketball team and the Iran national basketball team
 Rasoul Korbekandi (born 1953), goalkeeper of the Iranian National Team
 Moharram Navidkia (born 1982), captain of Sepahan FC
 Mohammad Talaei (born 1973), world champion wrestler
 Mahmoud Yavari (1939–), football player, coach of Iranian National Team
 Sohrab Moradi (1988–), Olympic weightlifting gold medalist, world record holder of 105 kg category
 Milad Beigi (1991–) Olympic taekwando bronze medalist, world champion
 Sina Karimian (born 1988), K-1 cruiserweight kickboxing champion

Writers and poets
 Mohammad-Ali Jamālzādeh Esfahani (1892–1997), author
 Hatef Esfehani, Persian Moral poet in the Afsharid Era
 Kamal ed-Din Esmail (late 12th century – early 13th century)
 Houshang Golshiri (1938–2000), writer and editor
 Hamid Mosadegh (1939–1998), poet and lawyer
 Mirza Abbas Khan Sheida (1880–1949), poet and publisher
 Saib Tabrizi

Others
 Ispahani family, Perso-Bangladeshi business family
 Abd-ol-Ghaffar Amilakhori, 17th-century noble
 Adib Boroumand (1924–), poet, politician, lawyer, and leader of the National Front
 George Bournoutian, professor, historian, and author
 Jesse of Kakheti, king of Kakheti in eastern Georgia from 1614 to 1615
 Simon II of Kartli, king of Kartli in eastern Georgia from 1619 to 1630/1631
 David II of Kakheti, king of Kakheti in eastern Georgia from 1709 to 1722
 Constantine II of Kakheti, king of Kakheti in eastern Georgia from 1722 to 1732
 Nasser David Khalili (1945–), property developer, art collector, and philanthropist
 Arthur Pope (1881–1969), American archaeologist, buried near Khaju Bridge
 Alexandre de Rhodes (1591–1660), French Jesuit, designer of Vietnamese alphabet, buried in the city's Armenian cemetery

See also

 15861 Ispahan
 Acid attacks on women in Isfahan
 Courts of Isfahan
 Isfahan National Holy Association
 Isfahan Seminary
 Islamic City Council of Isfahan
 List of the historical structures in the Isfahan province
 New Julfa
 Prix d'Ispahan

References

Citations

Works cited

Further reading

External links

 
 Street view 
 Public libraries atlas  (Persian)
 Digital Library of Isfahan Municipality 

 
Populated places in Isfahan County
Cities in Isfahan Province
Former capitals of Iran
Iranian provincial capitals
Achaemenid cities
Seleucid colonies
Parthian cities
Sasanian cities